Yus refers to a group of archaic letters of the Cyrillic script.

Yus or YUS may also refer to:
 Pulau Yus (Yus Island), an island in West Papua
 Yus Rural LLG in Morobe Province, Papua New Guinea
 YUS Conservation Area, Papua New Guinea
 Yonge–University–Spadina line, a subway line in Toronto
 IATA code for Yushu Batang Airport, China

See also 
 Jus (disambiguation)